Jan Peka (27 July 1894 – 21 January 1985) was a Czechoslovak ice hockey player who competed in the 1920 Summer Olympics, the 1928 Winter Olympics, and at the 1936 Winter Olympics.

Born in Rataje nad Sázavou, Austria-Hungary, Peka fought in the First World War and was captured, becoming a prisoner of war in Greece. He did not return home until 1919. He was also a member of the Czechoslovakian national team which won the bronze medal at the 1920 Summer Olympics, where ice hockey was first played. The original goaltender for the team, Karel Wälzer, broke his thumb prior to the start of the tournament, was unable to play the first two games. Peka was brought in to play against Canada and the United States, losing each game by a score of 15–0 and 16–0, respectively. Wälzer returned for the final match against Sweden, winning it and ensuring the Czechoslovakians won bronze.

He also participated in the 1928 ice hockey tournament and in the 1936 ice hockey tournament.

Notes

References

External links

1894 births
1985 deaths
Austro-Hungarian prisoners of war in World War I
Czech ice hockey goaltenders
Czechoslovak ice hockey goaltenders
HC Sparta Praha players
Ice hockey players at the 1920 Summer Olympics
Ice hockey players at the 1928 Winter Olympics
Ice hockey players at the 1936 Winter Olympics
Medalists at the 1920 Summer Olympics
Olympic bronze medalists for Czechoslovakia
Olympic ice hockey players of Czechoslovakia
Olympic medalists in ice hockey
People from Rataje nad Sázavou
People from the Kingdom of Bohemia
Sportspeople from the Central Bohemian Region